Junghuhnia kotlabae is a species of crust fungus in the family Steccherinaceae. It was described as a new species by Czech mycologist Zdenek Pouzar in 2003. The fungus, found in Cuba, was collected from a fallen stem of the Cuban royal palm (Roystonea regia). Distinguishing characteristics include the effuso-reflexed fruit bodies (mostly crust-like but with caps forming along the upper edge), broad spores, and two types of cystidia.

References

Fungi described in 2003
Fungi of the Caribbean
Steccherinaceae